Shaheen Baig  (born 3 April 1972) (Urdu:شاہین بیگ) is a Pakistani mountaineer. He is also the co-founder and instructor in Shimshal Mountaineering School, and is a member of the Alpine Club.

Early life
Shaheen Baig was born in Shimshal village, Hunza–Nagar District of Gilgit-Baltistan, Pakistan. He experienced childhood in the Shimshal valley and spent his initial years moving in the Karakorum and became endlessly in love with the mountains.

Mountain climbing career
Baig started his mountaineering career in 1995 as a high altitude porter with a Korean expedition. In 1997, he summited Muztagh Ata with a Japanese team. Baig's first expedition to an  peak was with a Japanese team that attempted Gasherbrum II in 2001. He was successful in reaching the top. Later, Baig attempted Broad Peak in 2002 and Nanga Parbat in 2003, before ascending K2 in 2004.

List of mountains climbed

Shimshal Mountaineering School
Established formally in 2009 with the support of Simone Moro, Shimshal Mountaineering School is a pioneer in professional mountaineering training institute in Pakistan. A dream project of Baig and Qudrat Ali, Shimshal Mountaineering School strives to promote healthy sports and excellence in professional mountaineering through extensive hands-on mountaineering training programs. Led by a team of renowned mountaineering instructors, with treasure of mountaineering experience, Shimshal Mountaineering School has a very customized and tailor-made mountaineering courses to suit the needs of beginners as well as advanced level mountaineers. Located at the heart of Shimshal. Shimshal Mountaineering School is the first ever mountaineering institute in Pakistan which initiated an exclusive mountaineering program for women since its inception.

See also 

 Qudrat Ali
 Meherban Karim

References

Living people
1972 births
People from Hunza-Nagar District
Pakistani mountain climbers
Organization founders